Sheikh Liaquat Hussain (1929 – 23 September 2009), was a Pakistani politician who was a Member of the National Assembly of Pakistan from 1997 to 1999.

Early life and career 
Hussain was born in 1929.. He married Ghousia Mahmooda Sultana from he had two sons named Imran Liaquat and Aamir Liaquat Hussain, who was a Pakistani television host and politician.

He was elected to the National Assembly of Pakistan from Constituency NA-195 (Karachi East-IV) as a candidate of Haq Parast Group (MQM) in 1997 Pakistani general election.

Death 
Hussain died on 23 September 2009 in Karachi at the age of 80.

References

Further reading 
 Shocking TV interview hants dr. Aamir Liaquat's career, Daily Times Monitor, 26 May 2005

1929 births
2009 deaths
Muhajir people
People from Agra
Muttahida Qaumi Movement politicians
Pakistani MNAs 1997–1999